Kavelstorf is a village and a former municipality in the district of Rostock, in Mecklenburg-Vorpommern, Germany. Since 7 June 2009, it has been part of the Dummerstorf municipality. Before this, it was part of the Warnow-Ost Amt.

Villages in Mecklenburg-Western Pomerania